COOLFluiD is a component based scientific computing environment that handles high-performance computing problems with focus on complex computational fluid dynamics (CFD) involving multiphysics phenomena.

It features a Collaborative Simulation Environment where multiple physical models and multiple discretization  methods are implemented as components within the environment. These components form a component-based architecture where they serve as building blocks of customized applications.

Capabilities

Kernel
 Component based architecture
 Dynamic loading of external plugins
 Interpolation and integration on arbitrary elements
 Transparent MPI parallelization 
 Parallel writing and reading from solution files
 Support for XML case files
 Unstructured 2D/3D hybrid meshes in many formats

Numerical Methods
 Cell Center finite volume solver
 Residual distribution solver
 High order finite element solver
 Spectral Finite Volume solver
 Spectral Finite Difference solver
 Discontinuous Galerkin method solver
 Residual Distribution solver (dedicated to incompressible flow)

Physical Models
 Compressible Euler and Navier-Stokes Equations
 Perfect and Real Gas (from low Mach to hypersonic)
 Chemical reacting mixtures
 Thermal and Chemical non-equilibrium flows
 Incompressible Navier-Stokes
 Linearized Euler (for Aeroacoustics)
 Ideal Magnetohydrodynamics
 Structural Elasticity
 Multi-ion Electrochemistry
 Heat transfer
 Multiple Scalar Advection models

External links
 New COOLFluiD website on GitHub
 VKI is the research institute responsible for the majority of the developments.

Computational fluid dynamics
Fluid dynamics